In England the office of Historiographer Royal, a historian under the official patronage of the royal court, was created in 1660 with an annual salary of £200 and a butt of sack.

Historiographers Royal

Holders of the office included:

 1660–1666: James Howell
 1670–1689: John Dryden, simultaneously also poet laureate
 1689–1692: Thomas Shadwell, simultaneously also poet laureate
 1692–1714: Thomas Rymer
 1714–1727: Thomas Madox
 1727–1737: Robert Stephens

Further reading

See also
 Historiographer Royal (Scotland), created 1681 and still extant
 Historiographer Royal (Sweden)

Positions within the British Royal Household
Historiography of England